Emma Black, also known as Emma Keriman Mahomed, was a British nineteenth century painter.

She was the sister of translator Constance Garnett, and of Clementina Black, a novelist and social reformer.

She was a resident of Brighton, and exhibited there in 1881. She also exhibited her works, one of which was a portrait of the writer Dollie Radford, at the Royal Academy under her married name Emma Keriman Mahomed in 1883 and 1884.

She married the Reverend James Dean Keriman Mahomed in September 1883.

References 

English women painters
Artists from Brighton
19th-century British women artists
Year of birth missing
Year of death missing
19th-century English women
19th-century English people